Zərqava (also, Zarqava) is a village in the municipality of Nuran in the Agsu Rayon of Azerbaijan.

References

Populated places in Agsu District